The Arab Capital of Culture is an initiative taken by the Arab League under the UNESCO Cultural Capitals Program to promote and celebrate Arab culture and encourage cooperation in the Arab region.

Cultural capitals

Map

See also

Notes

References

External links
Algiers Arab Capital of Culture 2007 - Official website
Damascus Arab Capital of Culture 2008 - Official website
Al-Quds Arab Capital of Culture 2009 - Official website
East Jerusalem: "Capital of Arab Culture 2009"
Manama Arab Capital of Culture 2012 - Official website

 
UNESCO
Arab culture